Vasylivka is a village in Bolhrad Raion, Odesa Oblast, Ukraine.

History
The village was built  by Bulgarian refugees that came from a village named Vaisal (Odrinsko) & Stara Planina.

At first this was not in Ukraine but it was called Besarabia and was part of Romania until 1879. In 1861–1862, there were 1568 refugees that came from Bulgaria.

Notable people
 Elena Alistar

References

External links 
 Datele generale ale recensământului din 2001

Villages in Bolhrad Raion
Ismail County